Atlanta Exes is an American reality documentary television series on VH1 that premiered on August 18, 2014. The show is a spin-off of the series Hollywood Exes based in Atlanta, Georgia. The show follows lives of several women who have been previously married to famous men.

Cast
 Tameka Raymond, ex-wife of Usher
 Christina Johnson, ex-wife of CeeLo Green
 Monyetta Shaw, ex-fiancée of Ne-Yo
 Sheree Buchanan, ex-wife of Ray Buchanan
 Torrei Hart, ex-wife of Kevin Hart

Episodes

References

External links 

 
 
 

2010s American reality television series
2014 American television series debuts
English-language television shows
Television shows set in Atlanta
VH1 original programming
2014 American television series endings
American television spin-offs
Reality television spin-offs